Maybe April is an American musical duo based in Nashville who play Americana indie folk. They have opened shows for Brandy Clark and Sarah Jarosz. Singers Katy Bishop, Alaina Stacey and former member Kristen Castro met at Grammy camp in 2012. Kristen Castro left the band in February 2019. When they performed as a trio, their harmonies were described as "lustrous" and "spring-clear".

References

External links

 Maybe April on Audiotree Live (full session)

Vocal trios
All-female bands
Americana music groups
Musical groups from Nashville, Tennessee
Musical groups established in 2012
2012 establishments in Tennessee